The 2020 United States House of Representatives elections in Pennsylvania was held on November 3, 2020, to elect the 18 U.S. representatives from the state of Pennsylvania, one from each of the state's 18 congressional districts. The state's primary election occurred on June 2, 2020. The elections coincided with the 2020 U.S. presidential election, as well as other elections to the House of Representatives, elections to the United States Senate and various state and local elections.

Overview

Statewide

District
Results of the 2020 United States House of Representatives elections in Pennsylvania by district:

District 1

The 1st district consists of all of Bucks County and a sliver of Montgomery County. The incumbent is Republican Brian Fitzpatrick, who was re-elected with 51.3% of the vote in 2018.

Republican primary

Candidates

Nominee
Brian Fitzpatrick, incumbent U.S. representative

Eliminated in primary
Andy Meehan, president of investment advisory firm

Endorsements

Primary results

Democratic primary

Candidates

Nominee
Christina Finello, Ivyland borough councilwoman and Bucks County Deputy Director of Housing and Human Services

Eliminated in primary
Skylar Hurwitz, owner of Demetrius Consulting, a technology consulting firm

Withdrew
Judi Reiss, Bucks County prothonotary and former Lower Makefield Township supervisor
Debra Wachspress, member of the Pennsbury School District school board

Declined
Diane Ellis-Marseglia, Bucks County commissioner
Patrick Murphy, former United States Under Secretary of the Army and former U.S. representative for Pennsylvania's 8th congressional district (2007–2011)
Rachel Reddick, U.S. Navy veteran and candidate for Pennsylvania's 1st congressional district in 2018

Endorsements

Primary results

Libertarian primary

Candidates

Nominee
Steve Scheetz, chair of the Libertarian Party of Pennsylvania (write-in)

General election

Predictions

Polling

with Debbie Waschspress

with Generic Republican and Generic Democrat

Results

District 2

The 2nd district consists of  Northeast Philadelphia and parts of North Philadelphia. The incumbent is Democrat Brendan Boyle who was re-elected with 79.0% of the vote in 2018.

Democratic primary

Nominee
 Brendan Boyle, incumbent U.S. representative

Primary results

Republican primary

Candidates

Nominee
David Torres, community activist

Primary results

General election

Predictions

Results

District 3

The 3rd district is anchored by Philadelphia, taking in the northwest, west, and Center City sections of the city. The incumbent is Democrat Dwight Evans, who was re-elected with 93.4% of the vote in 2018.

Democratic primary

Candidates

Nominee
Dwight Evans, incumbent U.S. representative

Endorsements

Primary results

Republican primary

Candidates

Nominee
Michael Harvey, Philadelphia's 60th Ward Chairperson and military veteran

Primary results

General election

Predictions

Results

District 4

The 4th district takes in the northern suburbs of Philadelphia, centering on Montgomery County. The incumbent is Democrat Madeleine Dean, who was elected with 63.5% of the vote in 2018.

Democratic primary

Candidates

Nominee
Madeleine Dean, incumbent U.S. representative

Endorsements

Primary results

Republican primary

Candidates

Nominee
Kathy Barnette, military veteran and political commentator

Withdrawn
 Renee Beadencup, paralegal

Endorsements

Primary results

Independent candidates
Joe Tarshish, auditor (write-in)

General election

Predictions

Results

District 5

The 5th district consists of Delaware County, portions of South Philadelphia, and a sliver of Montgomery County. The incumbent is Democrat Mary Gay Scanlon who flipped the district with 65.2% of the vote in 2018.

Democratic primary

Candidates

Nominee
Mary Gay Scanlon, incumbent U.S. representative

Endorsements

Primary results

Republican primary

Candidates

Nominee
Dasha Pruett, photographer

Eliminated in primary
Rob Jordan, activist

Primary results

General election

Predictions

Results

District 6

The 6th district encompasses all of Chester County and the part of southern Berks County including Reading. The incumbent is Democrat Chrissy Houlahan, who flipped the district and was elected with 58.9% of the vote in 2018.

Democratic primary

Candidates

Nominee
Chrissy Houlahan, incumbent U.S. representative

Endorsements

Primary results

Republican primary

Candidates

Nominee
John Emmons, chemical engineer

Declined
Ryan Costello, former U.S. representative

Primary results

Independents

Candidates

Declared
 John McHugh, Honey Brook Township Chairman and Marine veteran (write-in)

General election

Predictions

Results

District 7

The 7th district is based in the Lehigh Valley, and consists of Lehigh and Northampton counties as well as parts of Monroe County, including the cities of Allentown, Bethlehem, and Easton. The incumbent is Democrat Susan Wild, who flipped the district and was elected with 53.5% of the vote in 2018.

Democratic primary

Nominee
Susan Wild, incumbent U.S. representative

Endorsements

Primary results

Republican primary

Candidates

Nominee
Lisa Scheller, former Lehigh County commissioner

Eliminated in primary
Dean Browning, former Lehigh County commissioner, businessman, and candidate for Pennsylvania's 7th congressional district in 2018

Did not qualify for ballot access
Matthew D. Connolly, Republican nominee for PA-17 in 2018

Endorsements

Primary results

General election

Predictions

Polling

Results

District 8

The 8th district, based in the northeastern part of the state, is home to the cities of Scranton and Wilkes-Barre. The incumbent is Democrat Matt Cartwright, who was re-elected with 54.6% of the vote in 2018.

Democratic primary

Candidates

Nominee
Matt Cartwright, incumbent U.S. representative

Endorsements

Primary results

Republican primary

Candidates

Nominee
Jim Bognet, former senior vice president for communications of the Export–Import Bank of the United States

Eliminated in primary
Mike Cammisa, bar manager
Teddy Daniels, former police officer and U.S. Army veteran
Earl Granville, U.S. Army veteran
Harry Haas, Luzerne County councilman
Michael Marsicano, former mayor of Hazleton

Declined
Lou Barletta, former U.S. representative and nominee for U.S. Senate in 2018

Primary results

General election

Predictions

Polling

Results

District 9

The 9th district encompasses the Coal Region of Northeastern Pennsylvania. The incumbent is Republican Dan Meuser, who was elected with 59.7% of the vote in 2018.

Republican primary

Candidates

Nominee
Dan Meuser, incumbent U.S. representative

Endorsements

Primary results

Democratic primary

Nominee
Gary Wegman, dentist

Eliminated in primary
Laura Quick, delivery driver

Primary results

General election

Predictions

Results

District 10

The 10th district covers all of Dauphin County and parts of Cumberland and York counties, including the cities of Harrisburg and York. The incumbent is Republican Scott Perry, who was re-elected with 51.3% of the vote in 2018.

Republican primary

Candidates

Nominee
Scott Perry, incumbent U.S. representative

Withdrew
Bobby Jeffries, logistics director

Endorsements

Primary results

Democratic primary

Candidates

Nominee
Eugene DePasquale, Pennsylvania auditor general

Eliminated in primary
Tom Brier, attorney

Withdrew
Jobo Dean, businessman

Declined
George Scott, U.S. Army veteran, pastor, and nominee for Pennsylvania's 10th congressional district in 2018 (running for PA Senate, District 15)

Endorsements

Polling

Primary results

General election

Predictions

Polling

Results

District 11

The 11th district is located in South Central Pennsylvania, centering on Lancaster County and southern York County. The incumbent is Republican Lloyd Smucker, who was re-elected with 59.0% of the vote in 2018.

Republican primary

Candidates

Nominee
Lloyd Smucker, incumbent U.S. representative

Primary results

Democratic primary

Candidates

Nominee
Sarah Hammond, high school field hockey coach

Eliminated in primary

Paul Daigle, university student employment manager

Endorsements

Primary results

General election

Predictions

Results

District 12

The 12th district encompasses rural North Central Pennsylvania, including Williamsport. The incumbent is Republican Fred Keller, who was elected in a 2019 special election with 68.1% of the vote.

Republican primary

Candidates

Nominee
Fred Keller, incumbent U.S. representative

Endorsements

Primary results

Democratic primary

Candidates

Nominee
Lee Griffin, businessman

Primary results

Libertarian primary

Candidates

Nominee
Elizabeth Terwilliger, speech-language pathologist

General election

Predictions

Results

District 13

The 13th district encompasses rural southwestern Pennsylvania, including Altoona. The incumbent is Republican
John Joyce, who was elected with 70.5% of the vote in 2018.

Republican primary

Candidates

Nominee
John Joyce, incumbent U.S. representative

Endorsements

Primary results

Democratic primary

Candidates

Nominee
Todd Rowley, former FBI Agent, park ranger

Primary results

General election

Predictions

Results

District 14

The 14th district encompasses the southern exurbs of Pittsburgh. The incumbent is Republican Guy Reschenthaler, who was elected with 57.9% of the vote in 2018.

Republican primary

Candidates

Nominee
Guy Reschenthaler, incumbent U.S. representative

Endorsements

Primary results

Democratic primary

Candidates

Nominee
Bill Marx, high school teacher and U.S. Army veteran

Primary results

General election

Predictions

Results

District 15

The 15th district is located in rural North Central Pennsylvania. The incumbent is Republican Glenn Thompson, who was re-elected with 67.8% of the vote in 2018.

Republican primary

Candidates

Nominee
Glenn Thompson, incumbent U.S. representative

Endorsements

Primary results

Democratic primary

Candidates

Nominee
Robert Williams, minister

Primary results

General election

Predictions

Results

District 16

The 16th district is located in the northwestern portion of the state, and covers all of Erie, Crawford, Mercer, and Lawrence counties, as well as much of Butler County. The incumbent is Republican Mike Kelly, who was re-elected with 51.6% of the vote in 2018.

Republican primary

Candidates

Nominee
Mike Kelly, incumbent U.S. representative

Endorsements

Primary results

Democratic primary

Candidates

Nominee
 Kristy Gnibus, teacher

Withdrew
 Daniel Smith Jr., bank manager and candidate for Pennsylvania House of Representatives in 2018 (running for Pennsylvania House of Representatives, District 12)
Edward DeSantis, Mercer County resident and working class advocate (withdrew and endorsed Gnibus)

Declined
Ryan Bizzarro, state representative

Primary results

General election

Predictions

Polling

Results

District 17

The 17th district encompasses the northwestern Pittsburgh suburbs, including Beaver County, the southwestern corner of Butler County, and northern Allegheny County. The incumbent is Democrat Conor Lamb, who was re-elected with 56.3% of the vote in 2018.

Democratic primary

Candidates

Nominee
Conor Lamb, incumbent U.S. representative

Endorsements

Primary results

Republican primary

Nominee
Sean Parnell, U.S. Army veteran

Endorsements

Primary results

General election

Predictions

Polling

Results

District 18

The 18th district includes the entire city of Pittsburgh and parts of surrounding suburbs. The incumbent is Democrat Mike Doyle, who was re-elected unopposed in 2018.

Democratic primary

Nominee
Mike Doyle, incumbent U.S. representative

Eliminated in primary
Jerry Dickinson, law professor

Disqualified
Janis Brooks, former pastor and nonprofit founder

Endorsements

Primary results

Republican primary

Candidates

Nominee
Luke Negron, Pennsylvania Air National Guard military member

Primary results

Independents

Candidates

Declared
Donald Nevills, Navy veteran and business owner (write-in)
Daniel Vayda (write-in)

General election

Predictions

Results

See also
 2020 Pennsylvania elections

Notes

Partisan clients

References

External links
Official campaign websites for 1st district candidates
 Christina Finello (D) for Congress
 Brian Fitzpatrick (R) for Congress
 Steve Scheetz (L) for Congress

Official campaign websites for 2nd district candidates
 Brendan Boyle (D) for Congress
 David Torres (R) for Congress

Official campaign websites for 3rd district candidates
 Dwight Evans (D) for Congress
 Michael Harvey (R) for Congress

Official campaign websites for 4th district candidates
 Kathy Barnette (R) for Congress
 Madeleine Dean (D) for Congress
 Joe Tarshish (I) for Congress

Official campaign websites for 5th district candidates
 Dasha Pruett (R) for Congress
 Mary Gay Scanlon (D) for Congress

Official campaign websites for 6th district candidates
 John Emmons (R) for Congress
 Chrissy Houlahan (D) for Congress
 John McHugh (I) for Congress

Official campaign websites for 7th district candidates
 Lisa Scheller (R) for Congress
 Susan Wild (D) for Congress

Official campaign websites for 8th district candidates
 Jim Bognet (R) for Congress
 Matt Cartwright (D) for Congress

Official campaign websites for 9th district candidates
 Dan Meuser (R) for Congress
 Gary Wegman (D) for Congress

Official campaign websites for 10th district candidates
 Eugene DePasquale (D) for Congress
 Scott Perry (R) for Congress

Official campaign websites for 11th district candidates
 Sarah Hammond (D) for Congress 
 Lloyd Smucker (R) for Congress

Official campaign websites for 12th district candidates
 Lee Griffin (D) for Congress 
 Fred Keller (R) for Congress
 Elizabeth Terwilliger (L) for Congress

Official campaign websites for 13th district candidates
 John Joyce (R) for Congress
 Todd Rowley (D) for Congress

Official campaign websites for 14th district candidates
 Bill Marx (D) for Congress
 Guy Reschenthaler (R) for Congress

Official campaign websites for 15th district candidates
 Glenn Thompson (R) for Congress
 Robert Williams (D) for Congress 

Official campaign websites for 16th district candidates
 Kristy Gnibus (D) for Congress
 Mike Kelly (R) for Congress

Official campaign websites for 17th district candidates
 Conor Lamb (D) for Congress
 Sean Parnell (R) for Congress

Official campaign websites for 18th district candidates
 Mike Doyle (D) for Congress
 Luke Negron (R) for Congress
 Donald Nevills (I) for Congress

2020
Pennsylvania
United States House of Representatives